Adélékè is both a surname and a given name of Yoruba origin, meaning "the crown or royalty triumphs". Notable people with the name include:

 Davido (David Adedeji Adeleke, born 1992),  Nigerian singer, songwriter and record producer
 Isiaka Adeleke (1955–2017), Nigerian politician
 Ademola Adeleke (born 1960), Nigerian politician
 Adedeji Adeleke (born 1957) president of Adeleke University.
 Kenny Adeleke (born 1983), Nigerian basketball player
 Adeleke Mamora (born 1953), Nigerian politician
 Seyi Adeleke (born 1991), Nigerian footballer

Adélékè is a popular Yoruba name, similar to that of Johnson or Jones or Smith with Caucasians or Europeans. The name Adélékè actually tells a story of what circumstances arose, in order for triumph to occur. Simply put: Adélékè is "the home of the Crown of Crowns, that sojourned, fought and won wars and battles through logical strategy, attention to detail and determination. Adélékè studies others, understanding their strengths and weaknesses, taking these into consideration, in order to win the war/battle. Upon completion of this task, the Crown returns home from battles and wars, all is still well." 

The Yorùbá people are mostly associated by state, meaning that an Adélékè in Abuja state might not be related to an Adélékè in Lagos state; just as Boris Johnson is not necessarily related to Magic Johnson.

References